New Zealand Republic Inc. is an organisation formed in 1994 whose object is to support the creation of a New Zealand republic.

The campaign chair is Lewis Holden, an Auckland political activist and businessman. The organisation is not aligned with any political party, its members and supporters are drawn from across the political spectrum.

Aims and principles
New Zealand Republic's constitution specifies the following aims and principles:
 Involving all New Zealanders in the debate;
 Providing relevant and reliable information;
 Focusing on ideas, not personalities;
 Winning a referendum to establish the republic;
Creating a republic does not require a codified constitution or any change to the Treaty of Waitangi, Flag of New Zealand or Commonwealth membership.

History
The organisation was formed in March 1994 and incorporated in February 1995, following National Party Prime Minister Jim Bolger's call for New Zealand to become a republic. Its membership was drawn from many political quarters (including journalist Jonathan Milne and New Zealand First Member of Parliament Deborah Morris), and called the Republican Coalition of New Zealand. Some of the group's members had been involved in the successful campaign of the Electoral Reform Coalition for electoral reform at a referendum in 1993. In 1996, writer Keri Hulme became patron of the group.

The group changed its name in 1999, coinciding with an unsuccessful Australian referendum on the same issue, to the Republican Movement of Aotearoa New Zealand (Aotearoa is a Māori name for New Zealand), and again in 2014 to New Zealand Republic.

It participated in the Building the Constitution conference held in 2000, putting forward three recommendations: greater civics education, considering republicanism as an option and continued facilitation of the republic debate.

The group was unrelated to the former Republican Association of New Zealand (sometimes called the Republican Movement as well), although Bruce Jesson was a member of New Zealand Republic until his death in 1999.

The group attracted controversy in 2008 by expressing disappointment that no member of the Royal Family attended the state funeral of Sir Edmund Hillary.

On 21 April 2008 the group released a poll of New Zealanders showing 43% support the monarchy should Prince Charles become king, and 41% support a republic under the same scenario. In October 2008, one week before the general election, the group released the results of an online poll held through a website named "The President of New Zealand". The poll allowed visitors to nominate and vote for their favoured New Zealander to be head of state. Dame Kiri Te Kanawa won the poll.

On 23 September 2009, the group launched a book entitled The New Zealand Republic Handbook, at an event hosted at Parliament by United Future leader Peter Dunne with several current and former MPs in attendance, including Green MP Keith Locke, Labour MPs Clare Curran, Charles Chauvel, Nanaia Mahuta and Phil Twyford, and National MPs John Hayes and Paul Hutchison.

The group participated in the Reconstituting the Constitution conference at Parliament in September 2010. Dean Knight, senior Victoria University of Wellington law lecturer and New Zealand Republic's constitutional advisor, put forward a so-called "soft-republic".

Policies

Head of State Referenda Bill

In 2002, Green Party MP Keith Locke drafted a member's bill titled the Head of State Referenda Bill, which was drawn from the members' ballot on 14 October 2009. It would have brought about a referendum on the question of a New Zealand republic. Three choices would be put to the public:
 A republic with direct election of the head of state;
 A republic with indirect election of the head of state by a three-quarters majority Parliament; and
 The status quo.
If no model gained a majority, a second run-off referendum would be held. If one of the two republican options were supported by the public, New Zealand would become a Parliamentary republic (rather than a presidential republic), with a head of state with the same powers as the Governor-General of New Zealand and serving for one five-year term. In May 2007, the Republican Movement agreed to support the bill to Select Committee stage. The Bill was defeated on 21 April 2010 by 68–53.

Constitutional Convention Bill
In January 2008, the group supported former Prime Minister Mike Moore's call for his Constitutional Convention Bill to be resurrected, despite Keith Locke MP stating the convention would be "too broad".

Governor-General Bill
The group supported the Governor-General Act 2010, which modernised the office of Governor-General, making the office's salary taxable. In response to the Bill passing its first reading, the group launched a "citizens process" for selecting the next Governor-General. In its submission to the select committee considering the Bill, the group suggested parliament appoint the next Governor-General with a three-quarters majority plus a majority of party leaders in parliament, with a similar dismissal process and a fixed five-year term.

Affiliations
In April 2005, the movement became a founding member of Common Cause, an alliance of Commonwealth republican movements.

See also
 Australian republicanism
 Republicanism in New Zealand
 Monarchy in New Zealand
 Monarchy New Zealand

References

Footnotes

Citations

Bibliography

 Republic - newsletter of New Zealand Republic (ISSN 1174-8621)

External links
New Zealand Republic

Republicanism in New Zealand
Republican organizations
Political groupings in New Zealand
1994 establishments in New Zealand